Frank Barlow may refer to:

Frank Barlow (footballer) (born 1946), British football coach and manager
Frank Barlow (historian) (1911–2009), British historian known for his biographies of medieval figures
Frank Barlow (Coronation Street), fictional character in the British soap opera Coronation Street
Frank D. Barlow (1891–1982), member of the Mississippi Senate

See also
Francis Barlow (disambiguation)